UCHA is the University Cooperative Housing Association, a student housing cooperative at University of California, Los Angeles.

UCHA may also refer to:
 Ucha, a character in the Tokyo Mew Mew manga series
 Ucha, a Portuguese parish